Versus is the fourth studio album by Japanese visual kei band Diaura, released on 29 November 2017, by Ains. It debuted on Oricon's weekly chart at the 30th place, and was 2nd on the Indies chart. On July 10, 2014 a single titled "Noah/" was released off the album.

Track listing

References

2017 albums
Diaura albums